Justin Michael Faulk (born March 20, 1992) is an American professional ice hockey defenseman currently playing for the St. Louis Blues of the National Hockey League (NHL). He previously played for the Carolina Hurricanes for the first eight years of his career. He was selected by the Hurricanes in the 2nd round (37th overall) of the 2010 NHL Entry Draft.

Before turning professional, Faulk played for the University of Minnesota Duluth where he set a new school record for most goals by a rookie defenceman and helped them capture the national championship.

Early life
Faulk was born on March 20, 1992, in South St. Paul, Minnesota to parents Gail and Dale. Faulk learned how to ice skate at three years old and began playing organized ice hockey at the age of six. His father died when he was seven years old and he was subsequently raised by his mother alongside his brother David. Following his father's death, Faulk described his mother as the biggest influence on his career.

Playing career

Amateur
Growing up in Minnesota, Faulk played prep ice hockey for South St. Paul High School before joining the USA Hockey National Team Development Program (USNTDP) for two seasons. During the 2007–08 season, Faulk recorded six goals and 15 assists to earn honorable mention all-conference honors. As a sophomore, he committed to play Division 1 hockey for the University of Minnesota Duluth for the 2010–11 season. Faulk had previously considered playing in the United States Hockey League but felt that the USNTDP would be better for his development.

Faulk spent the 2010–11 season playing for the University of Minnesota Duluth, helping them capture the national championship. During this season, Faulk set a new school record for most points in a single season by a freshman defenseman. His record was later beaten by Scott Perunovich in 2018. Faulk was then named to the All-WCHA Third Team and All-WCHA Rookie Team.

Carolina Hurricanes
On April 15, 2011, Faulk was signed by the Carolina Hurricanes to a three-year entry-level contract. Faulk scored his first NHL goal on December 9, 2011 against Chris Mason of the Winnipeg Jets.
In 2012, Faulk was selected as the lone Hurricanes representative to the NHL All-Star Game's YoungStar showcase, where he participated in the Hardest Shot competition.
In the 2014–15 season, Faulk was recognized with his first selection as an All-Star, playing for "Team Toews" at the 2015 NHL All-Star Game.

On October 5, 2017, Faulk and Jordan Staal were named co-captains of the Hurricanes. On February 13, 2018, Faulk recorded his first NHL natural hat trick becoming only the 10th defenceman in NHL history to score one. On April 23, 2018, Faulk was nominated for the King Clancy Memorial Trophy as a player who best exemplifies leadership qualities on and off the ice and gives back to his community. Instead of staying with co-captaincy the following season, the Hurricanes decided to name Justin Williams as captain; Faulk was named an alternate captain alongside Jordan Staal.

St. Louis Blues
On September 24, 2019, Faulk and a 2020 fifth-round pick were traded to the St. Louis Blues in exchange for Joel Edmundson, Dominik Bokk and a 2021 seventh-round pick. The Blues immediately signed Faulk to a seven-year, $45.5 million contract extension, which began during the 2020–21 season. By February 2020, Faulk had recorded 13 points in 53 games for the Blues. The Blues were eventually eliminated from Stanley Cup contention after losing 6–2 in Game 6 of the Western Conference First Round against the Vancouver Canucks.

The following season, Faulk returned to the Blues. During Game 2 against the Colorado Avalanche, forward Nazem Kadri hit Faulk with his shoulder, striking his head. As a result, Faulk missed Game 3 against the Avalanche and Kadri was suspended for eight games. The Blues were eventually eliminated from the 2021 Stanley Cup playoffs in Game 4.

International play

Internationally, Faulk has represented the United States at four different events. He helped the Americans win gold at the 2010 IIHF World U18 Championships and bronze during the 2011 World Junior Ice Hockey Championships. He also played at the Senior level at the 2012, 2013 and the 2014 World Championships, and made his Olympic Debut at the 2014 Winter Olympics in Sochi. Faulk was the youngest player on Team USA's roster for the 2014 Olympics, at the age of 21.

Career statistics

Regular season and playoffs

International

Awards and honors

References

External links

1992 births
Living people
American men's ice hockey defensemen
Carolina Hurricanes draft picks
Carolina Hurricanes players
Charlotte Checkers (2010–) players
Ice hockey players from Minnesota
Ice hockey players at the 2014 Winter Olympics
Minnesota Duluth Bulldogs men's ice hockey players
National Hockey League All-Stars
Olympic ice hockey players of the United States
People from South St. Paul, Minnesota
St. Louis Blues players
USA Hockey National Team Development Program players